Norway participated in the Eurovision Song Contest 2008 with the song "Hold On Be Strong" written by Mira Craig. The song was performed by Maria Haukaas Storeng. NRK organised the national final Melodi Grand Prix 2008 in order to select the Norwegian entry for the 2008 contest in Belgrade, Serbia. "Hold On Be Strong" performed by Mira Craig was selected as the winner following a five-week-long competition consisting of three semi-finals, a Second Chance round and the final.

Norway was drawn to compete in the first semi-final of the Eurovision Song Contest which took place on 20 May 2008. Performing during the show in position 9, "Hold On Be Strong" was announced among the top 10 entries of the first semi-final and therefore qualified to compete in the final on 24 May. It was later revealed that Norway placed fourth out of the 19 participating countries in the semi-final with 106 points. In the final, Norway performed in position 25 and placed fifth out of the 25 participating countries with 182 points.

Background

Prior to the 2008 Contest, Norway had participated in the Eurovision Song Contest forty-six times since its first entry in 1960. Norway had won the contest on two occasions: in 1985 with the song "La det swinge" performed by Bobbysocks! and in 1995 with the song "Nocturne" performed by Secret Garden. Norway also had the two dubious distinctions of having finished last in the Eurovision final more than any other country and for having the most "nul points" (zero points) in the contest, the latter being a record the nation shared together with Austria. The country had finished last eleven times and had failed to score a point during four contests. Following the introduction of semi-finals for the 2004, Norway has finished in the top ten one time.

The Norwegian national broadcaster, Norsk rikskringkasting (NRK), broadcasts the event within Norway and organises the selection process for the nation's entry. NRK confirmed their intentions to participate at the 2008 Eurovision Song Contest on 9 July 2007. The broadcaster has traditionally organised the national final Melodi Grand Prix, which has selected the Norwegian entry for the Eurovision Song Contest in all but one of their participation. On the same day, the broadcaster revealed details regarding their selection procedure and announced the organization of Melodi Grand Prix 2008 in order to select the 2008 Norwegian entry.

Before Eurovision

Melodi Grand Prix 2008
Melodi Grand Prix 2008 was the 46th edition of the Norwegian national final Melodi Grand Prix and selected Norway's entry for the Eurovision Song Contest 2008. The competition consisted of three semi-finals, a Second Chance round and a final in different cities across Norway, hosted by Per Sundnes. The shows were televised on NRK1 as well as streamed online at NRK's official website nrk.no.

Format
The competition consisted of five shows: three semi-finals on 12, 19 and 26 January 2008, the Second Chance (Siste Sjansen) round on 6 February 2008 and a final on 9 February 2008. Six songs competed in each semi-final and the top two entries proceeded directly to the final, while the songs that placed third and fourth proceeded to the Second Chance round. An additional two entries qualified from the Second Chance round to the final. The results in the semi-finals and Second Chance round were determined exclusively by public televoting. The results in the final were determined by public televoting and four regional juries.

Competing entries
A submission period was opened by NRK between 9 July 2007 and 1 September 2007. Songwriters of any nationality were allowed to submit entries, while performers of the selected songs would be chosen by NRK in consultation with the songwriters. In addition to the public call for submissions, NRK reserved the right to directly invite certain artists and composers to compete. At the close of the deadline, 600 submissions were received – 118 more than the previous year. Eighteen songs were selected for the competition by a jury panel. The competing songs were revealed on 13 December 2007, while the competing artists in each semi-final were revealed on 18 December 2007, 28 December 2007 and 4 January 2008, respectively.

Semi-finals
Three semi-finals took place on 12, 18 and 26 January 2008, held at the Sandvigå in Stavanger, the Kongsvinger Hall in Kongsvinger, and the Bodø Spektrum in Bodø. Six songs competed in each semi-final, the top two acts as determined by public televoting progressed to the final, which the third- and fourth-placed acts progressed to the Last Chance round.

Last Chance round
The six entries that placed third and fourth in the preceding three semi-finals competing during the Last Chance (Siste sjansen) round on 6 February 2008 at the Oslo Stratos in Oslo. "Hold On" performed by Tinkerbells and "Som i himmelen" performed by Ole Ivars proceeded to the final.

Final
Eight songs consisting of the six semi-final qualifiers alongside two qualifiers from the Second Chance round competed during the final on 9 February 2008 at the Oslo Spektrum in Oslo. The winner was selected over two rounds of voting. In the first round, the top four entries were selected by public televoting to proceed to the second round, the Gold Final: "Am I Supposed to Love Again?" performed by Veronica Akselsen, "Far Away" performed by King of Trolls, "Eastern Wind" performed by Torstein Sødal and "Hold On Be Strong" performed by Maria Haukaas Storeng. In the Gold Final, three regional juries from the three semi-final host cities awarded 2,000, 4,000, 6,000 and 10,000 points to their top four songs. The results of the public televote were revealed by Norway's five regions and added to the jury scores, leading to the victory of "Hold On Be Strong" performed by Maria Haukaas Storeng with 195,661 votes. In addition to the performances of the competing entries, the interval act featured performances by 1978, 1982 and 1983 Norwegian Eurovision entrant Jahn Teigen, who performed several of his past Melodi Grand Prix entries: "Optimist", "Mil etter mil", "Do Re Mi" and "Glasnost".

Spokespersons
 Stavanger: Kirsti Sparboe
 Kongsvinger: Anne-Karine Strøm
 Bodø: Ketil Stokkan
 Northern Norway: Jenny Jenssen
 Central Norway: Mona Grudt
 Western Norway: Synnøve Skarbø
 Eastern Norway: Linn Skåber
 Southern Norway: Jorun Stiansen

Promotion
Shortly after winning Melodi Grand Prix "Hold On Be Strong" reached number one on the Norwegian singles chart, VG-lista, and was the first Eurovision 2008 song to top the charts anywhere in Europe. Storeng later signed a record deal with Universal Music and released her latest album in Norway before competing at Eurovision in Belgrade.

Storeng attended the UK Eurovision Preview Party in London on 25 April 2008 to promote her entry internationally. She performed "Hold On Be Strong" during the event, and performed along with acts from eight other competing countries in the 2008 Eurovision Song Contest.

Before the Contest began it was announced by the European Broadcasting Union (EBU), the organisers of the contest, that Norway would be one of the stops on the Winner's Tour, in which the winner of the Contest would tour Europe.

At Eurovision
The 2008 Contest was the first to implement two semi-finals, with all countries, apart from the "Big Four" countries – Germany, Spain, France and the United Kingdom – and the host country, taking part in the semi-finals. The EBU split up countries with a friendly voting history into the two different semi-finals, to reduce the effect of diaspora and block voting seen in the Contest since the implementation of televoting in 1998. On 28 January 2008, the EBU held a draw which determined that Norway would compete in the first semi-final, held on 20 May 2008.

For the contest the commentator for the semi-finals and the final was Hanne Hoftun, who took over from the 2007 commentator and MGP host Per Sundnes.

Semi-final

Storeng competed in the first semi-final on 20 May 2008, performing 9th in the running order, following Slovenia and preceding Poland. For her performance she wore a mid-length blue dress, and was accompanied on stage by three female backing singers and two male backing singers, dressed in black and blue. The stage was filled with blue light, and a starry background was shown on the LED screens surrounding the stage. At the close of the voting Storeng received 106 points, placing fourth in a field of 19. Norway received points from all voting countries in the semi-final except for Greece. As such, Storeng qualified to the final of the contest, after being the last name to be pulled out of envelopes revealing the 10 qualifying entries.

925,000 viewers watched the first semi-final on NRK TV, gaining more than 200,000 viewers over the 2007 semi-final when Norway failed to qualify.

Final
After qualifying to the final Storeng was asked by the Norwegian delegation to cancel all activities and to not speak until the final, so that she would be able to give the best performance she could on the night of the final.

Storeng gave a repeat performance in the final on 24 May 2008, where she performed 25th and last in the running order, performing after eventual winners Russia. She received 182 points in the final, placing fifth of 25 competing countries. Storeng received the most points from neighbouring Finland and Sweden, who each gave their 12 points to Norway. She also received 10 points from Denmark and Iceland, as well as 8 points from Estonia. Norway itself gave 8 points to Iceland, 10 to Bosnia and Herzegovina and their maximum 12 points to Denmark. Her result was Norway's first top 5 placing in the contest since 2003.

Over 1.5 million Norwegians watched the final of Eurovision on television, with viewership increasing to almost 1.8 million during the voting. This was almost 82% of the TV share available who watched the show, as was the second highest viewing figures experienced for Eurovision ever seen in Norway, beaten only by the 1996 Contest, which was held in Norway.

Voting

Points awarded to Norway

Points awarded by Norway

After Eurovision
Storeng returned to Norway after the final as a heroine, with much praise given to her after her fifth place in Belgrade. "Hold On Be Stong" was later released in Sweden after Eurovision, where it peaked on the Sverigetopplistan at #8. The song also reached #37 on the Danish singles chart.

In November 2008, Storeng performed in the musical Grease at the Oslo Spektrum, playing the character of Betty Rizzo. She becomes one of the many number of artists who have competed at Eurovision to go on to perform in Grease, with others including Sally-Ann Triplet, who represented the United Kingdom in 1980 and 1982, and Olivia Newton-John, who represented the United Kingdom in 1974 and became famous for acting in the film version of the musical.

After receiving such a strong placing from a Norwegian-composed song, NRK decided to close off Melodi Grand Prix to foreign composers, something which the broadcaster was once reluctant to do. Stian Malme, project manager for Melodi Grand Prix, said that NRK "wants the Melodi Grand Prix to be a forum where Norwegian songwriters can develop and present themselves both nationally as well as internationally." Storeng returned to Melodi Grand Prix in 2009, this time as co-host of the contest with Per Sundnes.

Despite hosting MGP, Storeng was rumoured to be one of the participants in the Swedish preselection for Eurovision 2009 Melodifestivalen. She was rumoured to be competing in the contest as a duet with another former Eurovision artist, Anna Sahlene, who represented Estonia in 2002 with "Runaway". Due to conflicting dates with her hosting duties with MGP, the only possible semi-final she could compete in was the final semi-final, held one week after the final of MGP 2009. This news was confirmed by Sveriges Television (SVT), with Storeng and Sahlene competing in the fourth semi-final, held on 28 February 2009, with the song "Killing Me Tenderly". The duo failed to qualify to the final of Melodifestivalen 2009, placing seventh in the semi-final.

References

External links
Full national final on nrk.no

2008
Countries in the Eurovision Song Contest 2008
2008
Eurovision
Eurovision